USS Fixity (AM-235) was an  built for the United States Navy during World War II. The ship was ordered and laid down as  USS PCE-908 but was renamed and reclassified before her December 1944 commissioning as Fixity (AM-235). She earned two battle stars in service in the Pacific during the war. She was decommissioned in November 1946 and placed in reserve. In January 1948, she was transferred to the United States Maritime Commission which sold her into merchant service in 1949. Operating as the Commercial Dixie, she sank in the Ohio River in the late 1990s.

Career 
Originally named PCE-908, the ship was launched 4 September 1944 by Puget Sound Bridge and Dredging Company, Seattle, Washington; sponsored by Mrs. P. J. Toien; and commissioned 29 December 1944.

Sailing from San Pedro, California, 4 March 1945, Fixity trained in the Hawaiian Islands for the rest of the month, then crossed the Pacific on convoy escort duty to Eniwetok, Ulithi, and Okinawa. From her arrival there 16 May, Fixity took station in the inner screen protecting the masses of shipping at the island, on 22 June driving off a lone Japanese airplane which attempted to attack her. She served on patrol and escort at Okinawa until 30 August, then began minesweeping operations off Korea, concentrating on the approaches to Jinsen. On 8 September she rendezvoused with the amphibious force bringing troops to occupy Jinsen, into which she accompanied them.

Fixity arrived at Sasebo 10 September 1945, and based there for sweeping operations in Japanese waters until February 1946, when she sailed for the west coast and inactivation. She was decommissioned at Bremerton, Washington, 6 November 1946, and transferred to the Maritime Commission 23 January 1948.

She was sold to the Jeffersonville Boat and Machine Co. of Jeffersonville, Indiana and converted to river service in 1949 at Paducah Marine Ways, Paducah, Kentucky, and renamed M/V Commercial Dixie. She was later sold to the Cincinnati Marine Service of Covington, Ohio. She sank in Ohio River at Maysville, Kentucky late 1990s.

Fixity received two battle stars for World War II service.

References 
 
 NavSource Online: Mine Warfare Vessel Photo Archive - Fixity (AM 235) - ex-PCE-908

PCE-905-class patrol craft
Admirable-class minesweepers
Ships built by Lockheed Shipbuilding and Construction Company
1944 ships
World War II patrol vessels of the United States
World War II minesweepers of the United States
Shipwrecks of the Ohio River